The Ravi Express is an Express train belonging to Northern Railway zone that runs between  and  in India. It is currently being operated with 14633/14634 train numbers on a daily basis.

Service

The 14633/Ravi Express has an average speed of 43 km/hr and covers 107 km in 2h 30m. The 14634/Ravi Express has an average speed of 43 km/hr and covers 107 km in 2h 30m.

Route and halts 

The important halts of the train are:

Coach composition

The train has standard ICF rakes with max speed of 110 kmph. The train consists of 7 coaches:

 5 General
 2 Seating cum Luggage Rake

Traction

Both trains are hauled by a Ludhiana Loco Shed-based WDM-3A diesel locomotive from Pathankot to Amritsar and vice versa.

See also 

 Pathankot Junction railway station
 Amritsar Junction railway station
 Amritsar–Pathankot Passenger
 Amritsar–Pathankot DMU
 Verka–Pathankot DEMU

Notes

References

External links 

 14633/Ravi Express
 14634/Ravi Express

Transport in Amritsar
Transport in Pathankot
Named passenger trains of India
Rail transport in Punjab, India
Express trains in India